IMVBox is an online distribution platform established in September 2013 to support cinema of Iran. It was initially set up by an office in the UK but it has since opened offices in Tehran and the US. It offers legal English-subtitled Iranian movies. Its YouTube channel was launched in May 2014, providing content to Persian speakers, free of charge. The company aims to fight online piracy and copyright infringement. A campaign was rolled out on Facebook in July 2014 to promote IMVBox's work. The company has been supported in its work by a number of cultural organisations, including Middle East Now and Open City Docs Festival.

IMVBox is available to a global audience and welcomes those with an interest in Iranian cinema. It offers both classic Iranian films and the latest titles out of Tehran. To date it has secured the distribution rights to Fireworks Wednesday, Facing Mirrors and A Cube of Sugar. At present IMVBox holds over 1,600 titles, but films are being added to the collection gradually. Besides its extensive collection of documentaries, and short and feature films, IMVBox also provides its visitors with up-to-date and in-depth information on Iranian actors, filmmakers, producers and screenwriters.

IMVBox's profile was heightened over the summer of 2014, when it won appraisal from the Iranian film industry. In early May the Iranian Students News Agency carried a piece that described IMVBox's work in combating online piracy. On 20 July Iranian filmmakers including Mojtaba Mirtahmasb and Rakhshan Bani-Etemad released a statement in which they called on viewers of Iranian films to avoid engaging in online piracy. In the statement Mirtahmasb and Bani-Etemad encouraged their viewers and supporters to go to IMVBox, seeing it as a fair and legal option. Among the 200 signatories to the statement were filmmaker Jafar Panahi, actress Leila Hatami, and actor Ali Mosaffa.

References

External links
 http://www.imvbox.com/

Cinema of Iran